Hans Horrevoets (born 26 April 1974 in Made – died 18 May 2006) was a Dutch sea sailor.

Disappearance and aftermath
Horrevoets disappeared while he was among the crew of the ABN AMRO TWO. His colleagues later recovered him, but attempts to resuscitate him failed.

He was part of the Brunel Sunergy team in the 1997/98 Whitbread Round The World Race as youngest member in the race. In the 2001/02 he was to be part of the Belgium Yess project, but the project failed. He won the Swan Europeans twice with the Aqua Equinox, and as skipper with the Holmatro talentboat he won the Cowes Week (twice), the Fastnet Race, the Channel Race, the Round Gotland Race and was best boat at the 2005 Commodores' Cup.
 
Horrevoets was the owner of the company Yacht Invest in Terheijden, North Brabant, from 1998. His pregnant wife Petra and his eleven-month-old daughter Bobbi survived him.

Horrevoets Trophy
In May 2009, Volvo Ocean Race launched the Hans Horrevoets Rookie Award to recognize the outstanding under-30 sailor in each edition of the Race as nominated by the respective skippers.

Recipients 
 2008-09 - Michael "Michi" Mueller - Puma Ocean Racing.
 2011-12 - David "Dave" Swete - Team Sanya.
 2014-15 - Sophie Ciszek - Team SCA.
 2017-18 - Bleddyn Mon - Turn the Tide on Plastic

References 

1974 births
2000s missing person cases
2006 deaths
Dutch sailors
Formerly missing people
Missing person cases in England
People from Drimmelen
People who died at sea
Sport deaths in England
Volvo Ocean Race sailors
Sportspeople from North Brabant